A Mountain may refer to the local name of several mountains or hills upon which has been placed the letter "A," usually signifying the first initial of a nearby university. Includes the following mountains:

Sentinel Peak, University of Arizona
Tempe Butte, Arizona State University
Tortugas Mountain, New Mexico State University